Pablo Martínez Morales (born 30 November 1996) is a Paraguayan professional footballer who plays as a forward.

Career
Martínez spent part of his youth career with Nanawa, which preceded a move to 3 de Febrero in 2013. He was moved into their senior squad ahead of the 2018 Paraguayan Primera División season, making his professional bow during a 1–1 draw at home to Cerro Porteño. After making five more appearances for 3 de Febrero in 2018, Martínez left in June after being signed on loan by Argentine Primera División side Lanús.

Career statistics
.

References

External links

1996 births
Living people
Sportspeople from Asunción
Paraguayan footballers
Association football forwards
Paraguayan expatriate footballers
Expatriate footballers in Argentina
Paraguayan expatriate sportspeople in Argentina
Paraguayan Primera División players
Argentine Primera División players
Club Atlético 3 de Febrero players
Club Atlético Lanús footballers
Club Sportivo San Lorenzo footballers
Club Atlético Atlanta footballers